Joseph Gérard Lauri P. Landry (June 19, 1922 – July 25, 2008) was a Liberal Canadian Senator.

He established Cape Bald Packers, a lobster processing plant in Cap-Pelé, New Brunswick, in 1948. Starting off as a medium-sized business employing 30 people, the company continued to grow to where it now utilizes five Atlantic coast facilities and employs more than 1,000 people.

In 1982, he established les Plastiques Downeast Plastics, which produces polystyrene products for the aquaculture industry.

In 1996, Landry was appointed to the Senate by Jean Chrétien.

Awards
2001 Ernst & Young Atlantic Entrepreneur of the Year Trophy
1999, the Province of New Brunswick honoured him with its Excellence Award in recognition of his practice of employing individuals with disabilities
1983 The Commission économique du Sud-Est awarded its Certificate of Merit to Cape Bald Packers.

References

External links
 Funeral home obituary (with photo)
 
 Debates of the Senate (Hansard) - 2nd Session, 35th Parliament, Volume 135, Issue 2 - Introduction to the Senate (February 28, 1996)

1922 births
2008 deaths
Liberal Party of Canada senators
Canadian senators from New Brunswick
Businesspeople from New Brunswick